Heterophragma is a genus of two species of tree, constituting part of the plant family Bignoniaceae.
The species are found in Southeast Asia and India.

Naming and classification
Heterophragma is part of the Palaeotropical Clade of the Bignoniaceae, closely related to the following genera: Catophractes, Dolichandrone, Fernandoa, Kigelia, Markhamia, Newbouldia, Radermachera, Rhigozum, Spathodea, and Stereospermum; and to the Coleeae clade (which contains Colea, Phyllarthron, Phylloctenium, and Rhodocolea).
The Coleeae clade species are found in Madagascar and surrounding islands, whereas the other genera are found in Asia, Africa and Madagascar.

The influential Swiss botanist, Augustin Pyramus de Candolle (1778-1841) named the genus in 1845, in his publication Prodromus Systematis Naturalis Regni Vegetabilis.

Description
The trees, which can grow up to 20m tall, have whorled/verticillate arrangement of leaves, which are in 3 or four pinnate pairs.
Upper side of the leaves are hairy/possessing trichomes, which are star-shaped/stellate. Inflorescences/groups of flowers are in terminal thyrses (put simply, in a stalked arrangement at end of branches). Flowers are cream-white to pale yellow. Calyx are tubular and irregularly lobed. Corolla are tubular with unequal lobes, straight, cream-white to pale yellow in colour. The 4 stamen are shorter that the corolla, anthers are hairless, a single staminodium (infertile stamen structure) is adjacent to the stamens. Ovary is elliptical, lacks hairs and has many ovules per ovary chamber. Fruit are long cylindrical pods with woody valves. Calyx is not permanent on fruit. Seeds are broad and possess translucent wings.

Species
Heterophragma quadriloculare 
Heterophragma sulfureum 

The following former species have now been shifted to other taxa listed:
Heterophragma adenophyllum  = Fernandoa adenophylla 
Heterophragma chelonoides  = Stereospermum chelonoides 
Heterophragma longipes  = Fernandoa magnifica 
Heterophragma macrolobum  = Fernandoa macroloba 
Heterophragma roxburghii  = Heterophragma quadriloculare 
Heterophragma suaveolens  = Stereospermum chelonoides 
Heterophragma vestitum  = Heterophragma sulfureum

Further reading
Santisuk, T. & Vidal, J.E. (1985). Bignoniacées Flore du Cambodge du Laos et du Viêt-Nam 22: 1-72. Muséum National d'Histoire Naturelle, Paris.

References

 
Bignoniaceae genera
Taxa named by Augustin Pyramus de Candolle